Charles Lynn Oakley (born July 7, 1931) is a former professional American football player. He was drafted in the 23rd round of the 1954 NFL draft by the Chicago Cardinals, with whom he played for one game as a defensive back, in 1954. He attended Louisiana State University, where he played college football for the LSU Tigers football team. He was born in Montgomery, Alabama and attended high school in Lake Charles, Louisiana.

References

1931 births
living people
Players of American football from Montgomery, Alabama
American football defensive backs
LSU Tigers football players